Apatelodes cerrita is a moth in the family Apatelodidae. It is found in Minas Gerais, Brazil.

The larvae have been recorded feeding on Eucalyptus urophylla.

References

Natural History Museum Lepidoptera generic names catalog

Apatelodidae
Moths described in 1929